Tarsocera is a genus of butterflies from the subfamily Satyrinae in the family Nymphalidae.

Species
Tarsocera cassina (Butler, 1868)
Tarsocera cassus (Linnaeus, 1764)
Tarsocera dicksoni (van Son, 1962)
Tarsocera fulvina Vári, 1971
Tarsocera imitator Vári, 1971
Tarsocera namaquensis Vári, 1971
Tarsocera southeyae Dickson, 1969

External links 
"Tarsocera Butler, [1899]" at Markku Savela's Lepidoptera and Some Other Life Forms

Satyrini
Butterfly genera
Taxa named by Arthur Gardiner Butler